Spacecraft charging is what happens when charged particles from the surrounding energetic environment stop on either the exterior of a spacecraft or the interior, such as in conductors.

References

Spaceflight